Eric Butorac and Travis Parrott were the defending champions, but only Butorac tried to defend his title.
He partnered up with Scott Lipsky, but they lost to Alex Kuznetsov and Ryan Sweeting in the first round.
Kevin Anderson and Rik de Voest won in the final 6–4, 6–4, against Ramón Delgado and Kaes Van't Hof.

Seeds

Draw

Draw

References
 Doubles Draw
 Qualifying Draw

Odlum Brown Vancouver Open
Vancouver Open